Curtis McGriff (born May 17, 1958) is a former American football defensive lineman in the National Football League for the New York Giants and the Washington Redskins.

Early life
McGriff grew up in rural Houston County, Alabama in the southeastern corner of the state.  He attended and played football at Cottonwood High School in Cottonwood, Alabama graduating in 1976.  He played college football at the University of Alabama in Tuscaloosa, Alabama for the legendary coach Paul "Bear" Bryant from 1976 to 1979. McGriff was an interior defensive lineman for the 1978 squad that defeated Penn State in the famous “goal line stand” Sugar Bowl. He was also part of the 1979 team that repeated as undisputed national champions, punctuated by a win over Arkansas in the Sugar Bowl.

Professional career
McGriff entered the NFL and signed with the New York Giants in 1980 as a defensive lineman.  He made the NFL's all-rookie team that year and was a member of the Giants' 1986-1987 Super Bowl Championship team.  McGriff was primarily used as a defensive tackle and rotated into the game on downs when a running play was anticipated (McGriff would be rotated out of the game and a pass-rush specialist would be brought into the game on passing downs.)  He played his final season (1987) with the Washington Redskins.

After football
Formerly, McGriff lived in Hackensack, New Jersey in the New York metropolitan area. He was often seen at charity event such as Kidney Benefits with close friend and fellow Alabama player, Don McNeal, who played cornerback for the Miami Dolphins from 1980–1989.  On May 15, 2005, McGriff married his longtime girlfriend Maurie Morris. He taught at a correctional school in Lodi, New Jersey.
Mr. McGriff now lives in Dothan, Alabama.

References

1958 births
Living people
New York Giants players
Washington Redskins players
Alabama Crimson Tide football players
African-American players of American football
Players of American football from Alabama
People from Houston County, Alabama
People from Donalsonville, Georgia
21st-century African-American people
20th-century African-American sportspeople